Harry van den Brink (Harderwijk, 1961) is a Dutch officer. He has been the commander of the Royal Marechaussee since November 2015. 

When he was 17, he started his career in the Marechaussee. He worked at the security of Palace Soestdijk and the border security at Schiphol.

References

1961 births
Living people
20th-century Dutch military personnel
21st-century Dutch military personnel
Dutch generals
Dutch police officers
People from Harderwijk